Tetragnatha foveata, is a species of spider of the genus Tetragnatha. It is native to Sri Lanka, Laccadive Islands, and Maldives.

See also
 List of Tetragnathidae species

References

Tetragnathidae
Endemic fauna of Sri Lanka
Spiders of Asia
Spiders described in 1892